Wiltonia is a genus of Polynesian araneomorph spiders in the family Orsolobidae, and was first described by Raymond Robert Forster & Norman I. Platnick in 1985.

Species
 it contains nine species, found only in New Zealand:
Wiltonia elongata Forster & Platnick, 1985 – New Zealand
Wiltonia eylesi Forster & Platnick, 1985 – New Zealand
Wiltonia fiordensis Forster & Platnick, 1985 – New Zealand
Wiltonia graminicola Forster & Platnick, 1985 (type) – New Zealand
Wiltonia lima Forster & Platnick, 1985 – New Zealand
Wiltonia nelsonensis Forster & Platnick, 1985 – New Zealand
Wiltonia pecki Forster & Platnick, 1985 – New Zealand
Wiltonia porina Forster & Platnick, 1985 – New Zealand
Wiltonia rotoiti Forster & Platnick, 1985 – New Zealand

See also
 List of Orsolobidae species

References

Araneomorphae genera
Orsolobidae
Spiders of New Zealand
Taxa named by Raymond Robert Forster
Taxa named by Norman I. Platnick
Endemic spiders of New Zealand